Conrad Lee (born February 10, 1939) is the past mayor of Bellevue, Washington. He has served on the city council since 1994, and was elected mayor in 2012.

Early life and education
Lee was born in Kunming, China. His father was an aide to warlord Long Yun. After the death of his father, Lee moved to Hong Kong with his mother. In 1958, he moved to the United States to attend college at Seattle Pacific University. He received his bachelor's degree in engineering from the University of Michigan, and an MBA from the University of Washington. He moved to Washington in 1967 to become an engineer for Boeing. He has also worked as a stockbroker.

Political career
Lee was first elected to the Bellevue city council in 1994. He served as deputy mayor in 2010 and 2011 before being elected mayor in 2012. During his tenure on the city council, he was part of a majority that opposed an increase in the property tax and the Sound Transit's planned light-rail route through South Bellevue until a compromise was reached. He was the first Asian American mayor of Bellevue.

Lee won re-election in 2013 with a record 78% of the vote.

Lee won re-election in 2017 with 69% of the vote and $158,311 raised.

Lee won re-election in 2021 with a record low of less than 55% of the vote.

References

External links
 
 Official biography from the City of Bellevue

1939 births
21st-century American engineers
American mayors of Chinese descent
American politicians of Chinese descent
Asian-American people in Washington (state) politics
American stockbrokers
Boeing people
Chinese emigrants to the United States
Living people
Mayors of places in Washington (state)
People from Bellevue, Washington
Seattle Pacific University alumni
University of Michigan College of Engineering alumni
University of Washington Foster School of Business alumni
Washington (state) city council members
Washington (state) Republicans
Asian conservatism in the United States